Gheorghe "Gicu" Andronic (born 25 September 1991) is a Moldovan international footballer who plays as a midfielder for Milsami Orhei.

Career
A product of Zimbru Chişinău academy, Andronic had his professional debut for the club in the 2008–09 season. In December 2009 he went on trial at Croatian powerhouse GNK Dinamo Zagreb at the time when manager Krunoslav Jurčić in charge, and went on to sign a five-year contract with Dinamo in the 2010 winter transfer window.

Andronic plays as middle-fielder, and manager Krunoslav Jurčić and director of football Zoran Mamić decided to send him on loan spell at Dinamo Zagreb's satellite club NK Lokomotiva. In the following 2010–11 season it was agreed that Andronic would be sent on loan to HNK Gorica, club that competes in Croatian second division. Andronic debuted for Gorica in the 91st minute of the 12th round in 2010/11 season of 2. HNL with a 93rd-minute assist for a second goal in a 0–2 away win to HNK Suhopolje. On 22 February 2011, resigned his contract with GNK Dinamo Zagreb and joined to Swedish club IFK Värnamo.

National team
After being member of the Moldovan U21 team since 2010, Gheorghe Andronic made his debut for the Moldova national football team on 11 October 2011, in the last group match for the UEFA Euro 2012 qualifying match against San Marino. The match finished with a Moldovan victory of 4–0, which is a record as being the major victory ever of the Moldovan team in official matches, and Andronic contributed by scoring the final goal in the 87th minute of the match.

International stats

International goals
Scores and results list Moldova's goal tally first.

Personal life
Gheorghe is the younger brother of the Moldovan national player Oleg Andronic, and he is cousin with Valeriu Andronic and Igor Andronic who are former members of the national team of Moldova. His uncle Mihai is coach in Moldova.

Honours

Milsami Orhei
Divizia Națională: 2014–15
Moldovan Cup: 2017–18
Moldovan Supercup: 2019

References

External sources
 
 

1991 births
Living people
Footballers from Chișinău
Moldovan footballers
Moldova international footballers
Association football midfielders
Moldovan Super Liga players
FC Zimbru Chișinău players
FC Milsami Orhei players
Croatian Football League players
GNK Dinamo Zagreb players
NK Lokomotiva Zagreb players
HNK Gorica players
Superettan players
IFK Värnamo players
Degerfors IF players
Liga I players
FC Astra Giurgiu players
FC Rukh Brest players
Speranța Nisporeni players
FC Gloria Buzău players
Moldovan expatriate footballers
Moldovan expatriate sportspeople in Croatia
Expatriate footballers in Croatia
Moldovan expatriate sportspeople in Sweden
Expatriate footballers in Sweden
Moldovan expatriate sportspeople in Romania
Expatriate footballers in Romania
Expatriate footballers in Belarus